Abigail Aldrich Rockefeller (born 1943) is an American feminist, ecologist, and member of the Rockefeller family. She was a member of Cell 16, a radical feminist organization, in the 1970s. She also founded the Clivus Multrum company, which manufactures composting toilets.

Early life and education 
Abby Rockefeller was born in 1943, the eldest daughter and second child of David Rockefeller and Margaret McGrath. She has an older brother, David Jr., and four younger siblings, Neva, Peggy, Richard, and Eileen.

She attended the New England Conservatory of Music in the early 1960s, where she encountered teachers critical of social inequality in the United States. This experience led her to embrace Marxism, the politics of Fidel Castro and ultimately radical feminism.

Radical feminism 

She joined the Boston-area female liberation movement led by Roxanne Dunbar, which subsequently changed its name to Cell 16. Along with the other Cell 16 members, Rockefeller promoted self-defense for women and became skilled in karate in response to the frequent street harassment and sexual assaults women endured at the time. They set up a Tae Kwon Do studio in Boston and taught hundreds of women who, in turn, taught other women, becoming pioneers in self-defense for women. 

After reading Cell 16's radical feminist publication, No More Fun and Games: A Journal of Female Liberation, Rockefeller decided to join the organization. In issue 6, "Tell A Woman", published in May 1973, she contributed an article called "Sex: The Basis of Sexism", which posited that one driving force in sexism was male desire to access and control female sexuality for their own ends. After being infiltrated by Trotskyites and FBI agents, Cell 16 disassociated from its splinter group Female Liberation, which was providing a front for recruiting aspiring feminists to Trotskyism.

Environmentalism 
In the 1970s Rockefeller turned her attention to environmentalism, focusing on human waste. Rockefeller was the first American to install a composting system in her home in Cambridge, Massachusetts, even though the technology had been around since the 1930s. In 1973, she founded the Clivus Multrum company to manufacture composting toilets. In December 1996, she published an essay titled "Civilization and Sludge: Notes on the History of the Management of Human Excreta" in Current World Leaders International Issues.

As of 2005, Clivus Multrum was still the "largest distributor of composting toilets for public use in North America".

References 

American people of Scotch-Irish descent
1943 births
Living people
Rockefeller family
Winthrop family
American feminists
Radical feminists
American people of English descent
American people of German descent